Vulpeşti may refer to several villages in Romania:

 Vulpeşti, a village in Buzoești Commune, Argeș County
 Vulpeşti, a village in Dobroteasa Commune, Olt County

and to a village in Moldova:
 Vulpeşti, a village in Mănoileşti Commune, Ungheni district

See also 
 Vulpe, Vulpea, Vulpescu - Romanian family names